Manhattan Merry-Go-Round is an NBC musical variety radio program that was broadcast from November 6, 1932, until April 17, 1949. The musical revue was produced by Frank and Anne Hummert. Sponsored by Dr. Lyons Tooth Powder, the radio series was adapted by Frank Hummert and producer Harry Sauber into a 1937 musical comedy feature film for Republic Pictures.

Radio
The program simulated visits to New York night clubs. In a format slightly similar to Your Hit Parade, the top eight tunes of the week (a ranking based on the sales figures for records and sheet music) were performed by the orchestras of Andy Sannella and Victor Arden, with a line-up of vocalists that included Barry Roberts, Glenn Cross, Marian McManus and Thomas L. Thomas. The announcers were Ford Bond and Roger Krupp. The director was Paul Dumont.

The program began on November 6, 1932, on the NBC Blue Network, broadcast at 3:30 p.m. on Sunday afternoons, until April 9, 1933, when it moved to the NBC Red Network, airing Sunday evenings at 9 p.m., when it was heard in the same hour as the Hummerts' other music program, The American Album of Familiar Music.

Film

Charles Reisner directed the 1937 film, which was nominated for an Academy Award for Best Art Direction by John Victor Mackay.

References

1930s American radio programs
American music radio programs
NBC Blue Network radio programs
NBC radio programs
1932 radio programme debuts
1949 radio programme endings